Kitakata may refer to:
 Kitakata, Fukushima, a city in Japan
 Kitakata, Miyazaki, a former town in Japan
 Kitakata Station, a train station in Kitakata, Fukushima

See also
 Kitagata (disambiguation)